The hooded dotterel or hooded plover (Thinornis cucullatus) is a species of bird in the family Charadriidae. It is endemic to southern Australia, where it inhabits ocean beaches and subcoastal lagoons. There are two recognised subspecies which form isolated eastern and western populations. The eastern subspecies is of greater conservation concern, with listings varying from Vulnerable in South Australia and Victoria to Critically Endangered in New South Wales.

Taxonomy

The hooded dotterel was placed in genus Charadrius but in the early 2000s it was reclassified into the genus Thinornis, along with shore plover (Thinornis novaeseelandiae). In 2000 the number of mature individuals was estimated at 7,000. Alternative common names include: hooded plover, hoody, pluvier à camail (in French), kappenregenpfeifer (in German), and chorlito encapuchado (in Spanish).

Subspecies
Two subspecies of the hooded dotterel are now recognised.

 T. c. cucullatus (Vieillot, 1818) southern Australia, Victoria, Queensland, New South Wales, Tasmania and nearby islands. The population stands at 3000 and is declining.
 T. c. tregellasi  (Mathews, 1912) Western Australia, coasts and inland lakes, Cranbrook, Yalgorup National Park and points south. The population stands at 4000 and appears to be stable.

Description

The hooded dotterel is medium in size for a plover, stocky, and pale in colour. It has a black hood and throat with a white collar. Its red bill has a black tip. It has a red eye ring and orange legs. Underparts are white. Males and females are similar. Adults and juveniles are similar except the juveniles do not have the black head and hindneck, which are instead a sandy brown.

Behaviour

A clutch of 1–3 eggs is laid from August to March, which includes also the peak of the Austral summer tourist season in its range and it is thereby heavily impacted by human activities. The eggs are a matte beige or cream colour heavily sprinkled with dark brown and lavender markings, especially at the larger end of the egg. Pyriform in shape, they measure . Eggs hatch in about 30 days.  The eastern population eats a variety of invertebrates but little is known of the diet of the western population. Specifically it eats insects, bivalves, and sandhoppers. It is usually seen in pairs or small groups near the water. For breeding it will dig a shallow scrape in sand or gravel above high-water mark and line it with pebbles, seaweed, and other debris.

Threats 
The population of hooded dotterels has declined in eastern Australia as a result of disturbance by people, dogs, cats and horses, as well as predation by silver gulls (Larus novaehollandiae), ravens (Corvus spp) and introduced foxes. Fox predation is a major threat to the western subspecies.

Distribution and habitat
Its natural habitats are freshwater lakes, freshwater marshes, coastal saline lagoons, and sandy beaches. Heavy populations are found on beaches with seaweed and dunes. It is threatened by habitat loss because of its small population and limited native range. It is a non-migratory inhabitant of coastal and subcoastal Western Australia, South Australia, New South Wales, Victoria and Tasmania, and is a vagrant in Queensland.

Conservation

Important Bird Areas
BirdLife International has identified the following sites as being important for hooded dotterel conservation:

South Australia
 Coffin Bay
 Coorong
 Kangaroo Island

Tasmania
 Cape Portland
 Eastern Flinders Island
 King Island

 Marion Bay
 Melaleuca to Birchs Inlet
 North-west Tasmanian Coast
 Robbins Passage and Boullanger Bay
 St Helens

Victoria
 Corner Inlet
 Discovery Bay to Piccaninnie Ponds

 Phillip Island
 Port Fairy to Warrnambool
 Yambuk

Western Australia
 Lake Gore System
 Lake Warden System
 Pink Lake
 Yalgorup

See also
 Sanderling

References

External links

 
 Hooded plover threats and recovery strategies

hooded dotterel
Birds of Western Australia
Birds of South Australia
Birds of Victoria (Australia)
Birds of Tasmania
Endemic birds of Australia
hooded dotterel
hooded dotterel
Taxonomy articles created by Polbot